Wu Zhongxin, or Wu Chung-hsin (March 15, 1884 – December 16, 1959) was a General and government official of the Republic of China. He was associated with the CC Clique. In his tenure as the Chairman of the Mongolian and Tibetan Affairs Commission of the Republic of China, Wu was present at the enthronement of the 14th Dalai Lama. From late 1944 until early 1946 he was one of the few KMT governors of Xinjiang.

Footnotes

1884 births
1959 deaths
National Revolutionary Army generals from Anhui
Republic of China politicians from Anhui
Politicians from Hefei
Chinese police officers
Taiwanese people from Anhui